Minuscule 745 (in the Gregory-Aland numbering), ε605 (von Soden), is a Greek minuscule manuscript of the New Testament written on paper. Palaeographically it has been assigned to the 16th century. The manuscript has complex contents. Scrivener labelled it as 633e.

Description 

The codex contains the text of the four Gospels on 212 paper leaves (size ). The text is written in one column per page, 22 lines per page.

There is also another division according to the smaller Ammonian Sections (in Mark 234 Sections, the last section in 16:9), but there are no references to the Eusebian Canons.

Text 

The Greek text of the codex is a representative of the Byzantine text-type. Aland placed it in Category V.

It was not examined by using the Claremont Profile Method.

History 

Scrivener dated the manuscript to the 16th or 17th century, Martin to the 17th century; Gregory dated it to the 16th century. The manuscript is currently dated by the INTF to the 16th century.

According to Scrivener it is "a Western codex". According to Gregory it could be rewritten from the minuscule 732.

The manuscript was added to the list of New Testament manuscripts by Scrivener (633) and Gregory (745). It was examined and described by Paulin Martin. Gregory saw the manuscript in 1885.

The manuscript is now housed at the Bibliothèque nationale de France (Gr. 227) in Paris.

See also 

 List of New Testament minuscules
 Biblical manuscript
 Textual criticism
 Minuscule 744

References

Further reading 

 
 

Greek New Testament minuscules
16th-century biblical manuscripts
Bibliothèque nationale de France collections